The following lists events that happened during 1898 in Australia.

Incumbents

Premiers
Premier of New South Wales - George Reid
Premier of South Australia - Charles Kingston
Premier of Queensland - Hugh Nelson (until 13 April), Thomas Joseph Byrnes (died in office 27 September) then James Dickson
Premier of Tasmania - Edward Braddon
Premier of Western Australia - John Forrest
Premier of Victoria - George Turner

Governors
Governor of New South Wales – Henry Brand, 2nd Viscount Hampden
Governor of Queensland – Charles Cochrane-Baillie, 2nd Baron Lamington
Governor of South Australia – Sir Thomas Buxton, 3rd Baronet
Governor of Tasmania – Jenico Preston, 14th Viscount Gormanston
Governor of Victoria – Thomas Brassey, 1st Earl Brassey
Governor of Western Australia – Gerard Smith

Events
 6 May - The paddle steamer Maitland sinks near Broken Bay, drowning 24 people.
 3–4 June - A referendum is held in New South Wales, South Australia, Tasmania and Victoria to approve the draft Constitution of Australia. The constitution was accepted by the required majority in South Australia, Tasmania and Victoria, but not in New South Wales.
 17 October - The Perth Zoo opens with two lions and a tiger.
 26 December - Gatton murders - Three members of the same family are sexually molested and murdered near the town of Gatton, Queensland (unsolved).
 The Queen Victoria Building in Sydney is completed

Science and technology

Nothing much that is important happened to do with science and technology.

Arts and literature

 W. Lister Lister wins the Wynne Prize for landscape painting or figure sculpture for his landscape The Last Gleam

Sport
 The Grafter wins the Melbourne Cup
 Victoria wins the Sheffield Shield

Births
 12 February - Sali Herman (died 1993), war artist
 20 May - Matthew O'Sullivan (died 1967), senator and salesmen
 24 September - Howard Walter Florey (died 1968), pharmacologist and Nobel Prize winner
 9 December - Irene Greenwood (died 1992), radio broadcaster, feminist and peace activist

Deaths
 20 March - Sir Arthur Hunter Palmer (born 1819), Premier of Queensland
 30 July - Mary Colton (born 1822), philanthropist and suffragist
 19 September - George Edward Grey (born 1812), Governor of South Australia
 27 September - Thomas Joseph Byrnes (born 1860), Premier of Queensland
 2 November - George Goyder (born 1826), Surveyor-General of South Australia

See also
 List of Australian films before 1910

References

 
Australia
Years of the 19th century in Australia